The Battle on the Sutlej took place in March 1765, between the Durranis and the Sikh Misls as part of the Afghan-Sikh wars during Ahmad Shah Abdali's return home. The pitched battle ended indecisively.

Background
On Ahmad Shah Abdali’s return home, he crossed river Sutlej, entering Jullundur Doab and laid camp on the bank of the river.  The Sikhs harassed the Afghans on his return throughout the Jullundur Doab, which went on for seven days.  Battle on the Sutlej was the first day of harassment.  Next morning after crossing Sutlej and laying camp on the bank of the river, the Durrani advance guards barely travelled 3 km or 1 mile from the bank of Sutlej, when they were attacked by the Sikhs who closed their passage. The Afghans quickly prepared themselves by setting up their formation with Ahmad Shah positioning himself in the center, 12,000 soldiers commanded by Shah Vali Khan, Jahan Khan, Shah Pasand Khan, Anzala Khan and others on the right, and another 12,000 Baluchis commanded by Nasir Khan, on the left. The Sikhs also set up their formation with Jassa Singh Ahluwalia accompanied by Jassa Singh Ramgarhia in the centre while many other chiefs also placed themselves in appropriate positions in the centre, Charat Singh, Jhanda Singh, Lahna Singh and Jai Singh positioned themselves on the right, and Hari Singh Bhangi, Ram Das, Gulab Singh and Gujar Singh positioned on the left.

Battle
A furious battle took place with the Sikhs overpowering the right wing of the Durrani army after applying their usual tactic where Hari Singh dashed upon Shah Vali Khan and Jahan Khan and then retired to draw the Afghans to pursue them, where the Sikhs would then return and ambush the Afghans. Ahmad Shah who was quite aware of the usual tactics of the Sikhs of hit and retiring and then returning to attack again, called and warned Nasir Khan about this stratagem of the Sikhs. But despite the warning, Nasir Khan and his soldiers rushed in pursue only for another contingent of Sikh soldiers to rush to position themselves in between, cutting off both Ahmad Shah and Nasir Khan and then circling the retreating Baluchis army where a close bloody combat took place. The whole battle ended due to nightfall with both parties retiring.

Next morning, with sunrise, the Afghans moved onward but right after 5 km, they again came across the Sikhs who attacked the Durranis from all sides.  The formation of the Sikhs was reversed whereas Ahmad Shah applied same formation as previous day. Ahmad Shah told Nasir Khan and the whole army to not move a step without his order as he was aware of tactics of the Sikhs, and after waiting for some time, Ahmad Shah ordered an assault but the Sikhs resorted back to their tactics and retired, only for Afghans to pursue them for next 3 miles when the Sikhs returned, circled them and attacked them from all sides after scattering themselves.  Upset Ahmad Shah shouted at Nasir Khan to stick to his spot and attack the Sikhs only when they come closer to him and he advised all the remaining soldiers the same. Again with the nightfall, the battle came to a close.

Aftermath
Throughout the march through the Jullundur Doab from the bank of Sutlej to river Chenab, the Durranis were harassed and assaulted for seven days where the Sikhs returned again and again only to retire in same prevalence, as this was their war tactic.

References 

Battles involving the Durrani Empire
Battles involving the Sikhs